María Pujalte Vidal (born December 22, 1966 in A Coruña) is a Spanish actress.

She studied singing, drama and self-expression through movement in Santiago de Compostela and at the Scuola Internazionale dell'Attore Comico from Reggio Emilia with a scholarship of the Deputation of Corunna.

She has been a member of Centro Dramático Galego and of the theatre groups Moucho Clerc and Compañía de Marías.

Filmography

Short films

Television

As a conductor 
Gala Premios Max, 2003

As an actress

Theatre 
 The Real Thing (2010), by Tom Stoppard.
 Gatas (2008), by Manuel González Gil and Daniel Botti.
 Las cuñadas (2008), by Michel Tremblay.
 El método Grönholm (2007), by Jordi Galcerán
 Dónde pongo la cabeza (2006), by Yolanda García Serrano
 Confesiones de mujeres de 30 (2002-2004)
 Caníbales (1996)
 Martes de Carnaval (1995) by Ramón del Valle-Inclán
 Finisterra Broadway amén y squasch (1993)
 O Roixinol de Bretaña (1991) by Quico Cadaval
 Yerma (1990) by Federico García Lorca
 O Códice Clandestino (1989),  by Quico Cadaval
 O Mozo que chegou de lonxe (1989)

Awards 
Unión de Actores, Best New Actress with Entre rojas, 1995
Unión de Actores, Best Actress in a Supporting role  with Periodistas, 2000
Premios Teatro de Rojas, Best Actress with El método Grönholm, 2007
Festival de Cans, Pedigree Honor Award, 2011

References

External links 
 

1966 births
Living people
People from A Coruña
Spanish television actresses
Spanish film actresses
Spanish stage actresses
20th-century Spanish actresses
21st-century Spanish actresses
Actresses from Galicia (Spain)